Iciligorgia is a genus of soft coral in the family Anthothelidae.

Species 
The following species are recognized:

 Iciligorgia australis (Broch, 1916)
 Iciligorgia ballini Kükenthal, 1908
 Iciligorgia boninensis Aurivillius, 1931
 Iciligorgia brunnea (Nutting, 1911)
 Iciligorgia capensis (Thomson, 1911)
 Iciligorgia clavaria (Studer, 1878)
 Iciligorgia koellikeri (Studer, 1878)
 Iciligorgia rubra (Kölliker, 1870)
 Iciligorgia schrammi Duchassaing, 1870

References 

Octocorallia genera
Anthothelidae